Tagu 塔古 is a Loloish language spoken in parts of Dongshan and Sina townships in southeastern Yongsheng County by at least 2,000 people (Bradley 2004).

References

Loloish languages
Languages of China